Jang-hwa and Hong-ryeon (literally The Story of Janghwa and Hongryeon) is a 1924 Korean silent film, the first feature film produced entirely by Korean filmmakers. The film is based on a popular Korean fairy tale Janghwa Hongryeon jeon which had been adapted into film versions in 1924, 1936, 1956, 1962 and 1972.
Park seung pil was byeonsa for this film.

Cast
Ok-hui Kim  - Janghwa
Seol-ja Kim - Hong-ryeon
Byeong-ryong Choe
Jeong-sik Yu

References

1924 films
Pre-1948 Korean films
Korean silent films
Korean black-and-white films
Korean-language films
Films based on fairy tales